The 2016–17 EFL Cup was the 57th season of the EFL Cup, formerly known as the Football League Cup, featuring all 92 clubs from the Premier League and the English Football League (EFL). It began on the week commencing 8 August 2016 and concluded with the final on 26 February 2017. The cup did not have a sponsor following the withdrawal of sponsorship from Capital One after four years as the Capital One Cup, but was renamed the EFL Cup after the Football League was rebranded as the English Football League.

Manchester United won its fifth title after a 3–2 win over Southampton in the final.

Manchester City were the defending champions, but were eliminated by Manchester United in the fourth round.

Format
The League Cup is open to all 92 members of the Premier League and the English Football League and is divided into seven rounds, organised so that 32 clubs remain by the third round. Clubs involved in European competition during the season receive a bye to the third round, the remaining Premier League clubs enter at the second round, and the remaining Football League clubs enter at the first round.

The League Cup is played as a knockout cup competition with each tie, except semi-finals, being played as a single match with the winner advancing to the next round. The semi-finals are played over two legs, with each club playing one leg at home, and the club that scores more goals on aggregate over the two legs advances to the finals. If the score is level after 90 minutes, or if the aggregate score is level for semi-finals, then thirty minutes of extra time is played, divided into two fifteen-minute halves. If the aggregate scores in semi-finals are still level at the end of extra time the tie shall be decided by goals scored away from home counting twice, according to the away goals rule. If the tie is not decided during extra time, it is decided by a penalty shoot-out.

In the first five rounds, the club drawn first played at their home ground, and in the semi-finals the club drawn first played the first leg at home. The final was played at Wembley Stadium, a neutral ground.

Club allocation
A total of 92 clubs from the top four English tiers (Premier League, EFL Championship, EFL League One and EFL League Two) participated in the 2016–17 EFL Cup.

Distribution
The tournament was organised so that 32 clubs remained by the third round. Seventy of the seventy-two clubs in the English Football League (tiers 2–4) entered in the first round. In the second round, the thirteen Premier League clubs not involved in European competition as well as the two highest-ranked Championship clubs relegated from 2015–16 Premier League (Newcastle United and Norwich City) entered the cup, with Arsenal, Leicester City, Manchester City, Manchester United, Southampton, Tottenham Hotspur and West Ham United all receiving a bye to the third round. In the third round the aforementioned clubs involved in European competition entered the competition.
 Clubs involved in European competition entered at the third round.
 The remaining Premier League clubs and two highest-ranked Championship clubs entered at the second round.
 The remaining English Football League clubs entered at the first round.

Round and draw dates

The schedule was as follows.

First round

Entry
A total of 70 clubs played in the first round: 24 from League Two (tier 4), 24 from League One (tier 3), and 22 from the Championship (tier 2). The draw for this round was split on a geographical basis into 'northern' and 'southern' sections. Teams were drawn against a team from the same section.

Matches

Northern section

Southern section

Note: The numbers in parentheses are the tier for the team during the 2016–17 season.

Second round

Entry
A total of 50 clubs played in the second round: 15 that entered in this round and the 35 winners from the first round. The 15 clubs entering this round were the 13 clubs from the 2016–17 Premier League not involved in any European competition, plus the 18th and 19th placed teams from last season's Premier League. The draw for the second round was held on 10 August 2016

Matches

Note: The numbers in parentheses are the tier for the team during the 2016–17 season.

Third round

Teams
A total of 32 teams played in the third round, seven that entered in this round and the 25 winners from the second round. The seven teams entering in this round were the clubs from the 2016–17 Premier League that are involved in European competition in the 2016–17 season. There was no seeding in this round.

Matches

Note: The numbers in parentheses are the tier for the team during the 2016–17 season.

Fourth round

Teams
A total of 16 clubs played in the fourth round, all winners of the third round. There was no seeding in this round. The draw was held on 21 September 2016.

Matches

Note: The numbers in parentheses are the tier for the team during the 2016–17 season.

Fifth round

Teams
A total of eight clubs played in the fifth round, all winners of the fourth round. There was no seeding in this round and the draw was held on 26 October following the conclusion of the tie between Manchester United and Manchester City in the previous round.

Matches

Note: The numbers in parentheses are the tier for the team during the 2016–17 season.

Semi-finals

Teams
A total of four clubs played in the semi-finals, all winners of the fifth round. There was no seeding in this round and the draw was held on 30 November.

Matches
The semi-finals were played over two legs, with each team playing one leg at home, and the team that scored more goals on aggregate over the two legs advancing to the final.

First leg
The first leg matches were played in the week commencing 9 January 2017.

Second leg
The second leg matches were played on 25 and 26 January 2017.

Note: The numbers in parentheses are the tier for the team during the 2016–17 season.

Final

The final was held on 26 February 2017 at Wembley Stadium.

Top goalscorers

References

EFL Cup seasons
Efl Cup
England
Cup